Antonio José López Castillo (July 9, 1945 – July 18, 2021) was a Venezuelan Roman Catholic priest and prelate. He served as auxiliary bishop of the Roman Catholic Diocese of Maracaibo from 1988 to 1992 and the Bishop of the Roman Catholic Diocese of Barinas from 1992 to 2001. He then served as the  Archbishop of the Roman Catholic Archdiocese of Calabozo from 2001 to 2007 and the Archbishop of the Roman Catholic Archdiocese of Barquisimeto from 2007 until his retirement in March 2020.

Archbishop Emeritus Antonio José López Castillo died from a stroke in Maracaibo on July 18, 2021, at the age of 76.

References

1945 births
2021 deaths
Venezuelan Roman Catholic bishops
People from Maracaibo